The Kalmak Tatars (Siberian Tatar: калмактар) are one of the three subgroups of Tom group of Siberian Tatars. Their traditional areas of settlement are northeastern parts of Kemerovo Oblast, close to town of Yurga.

Origin of the Kalmaks is in the 17th century, when a group of Teleuts from central parts of Kemerovo Oblast migrated to the north. Kalmaks accepted Islam in the late 18th century, under the influence of Volga Tatars and Siberian Bukharans, and therefore created endogamous barrier between Kalmaks and Russians, which helped Kalmaks to preserve themselves.

In 19th-20th centuries Kalmaks inhabited mainly Zimnik, Bolshoy Ulus close to the town of Yurga, and Yurty-Konstantinovy to the northeast of Yurga, close to the Tomsk Oblast.

References 

Siberian Tatars
Kemerovo Oblast
Indigenous peoples of North Asia